Transtillaspis costipuncta is a species of moth of the family Tortricidae. It is found in Tungurahua Province, Ecuador.

The wingspan is about 19.5 mm. The ground colour of the forewings is cream, tinged with brownish. The ground colour is paler in the basal third of the wing and more ochreous in the terminal part. The hindwings are cream brown, but paler towards the base.

Etymology
The species name refers to the presence of costal spots on the forewings and is derived from Latin punctum (meaning a spot).

References

Moths described in 2009
Transtillaspis
Taxa named by Józef Razowski